The Samsung Wave II S8530 (or "Samsung Wave II") is the successor of the Samsung Wave S8500 smartphone running the Bada 1.2 operating system designed by Samsung, which was commercially released in October 2010. The Wave is a slim touchscreen phone powered by Samsung's "Hummingbird" CPU, which includes a 1 GHz ARM Cortex-8 CPU and a built-in PowerVR SGX 540 graphics engine, "Super LCD" display and 720p high-definition video capture capabilities.SlashGear speculated that the phone could be the result of a rumored AMOLED panel shortage.

Hardware features

Design

The phone is made of mostly metal alloy and is measured 10.9 mm thick. In terms of form factor, it is a slate-style featuring 3 physical buttons on the front: call, reject/shutdown, and main menu button.

Screen

The screen is a  capacitive touchscreen Super LCD with an anti-smudge oleophobic coating on top of the scratch-resistant tempered-glass (Gorilla Glass Display) touch panel, which has been shown to be capable of resisting extreme friction (scratch-resistant). The screen resolution is 800x480 WVGA.
 
Processor

The phone features a 1 GHz SoC, which internally contains an ARM Cortex A8 CPU core  identical to the ARM Cortex CPU core used in Apple's A4 package on package SoC. The Phone graphics engine is SGX 540 which is said to be capable of generating 90 million triangles per second (same as the SoC used on the Samsung Galaxy S).
And 256MB+128MB RAM (same hardware as the Samsung Wave S8500).

Camera

The phone features a 5 megapixel camera which supports 2592 x 1944 pixels, along with autofocus, LED flash, Geotagging, face, blink detection, image stabilization, touch focus, etc. Other than these features it has shooting modes such as beauty shot, smile shot, continuous, panorama and vintage shot. As a camcorder it is able to record a 720p HD video (1280x720) at 30 FPS with flash and a 320x240 slow-motion video at 120 FPS with flash.

Other features

Other features include A-GPS, 2 GB/8 GB of internal storage with a microSDHC slot for an additional 32 GB. It also has a magnetometer, a proximity sensor, an accelerometer, 5.1-channel surround sound Mobile Theater, music recognition, a fake call service, smart search and Social Hub. The Samsung Wave II is the first phone to support Bluetooth version 3.0. It also features Wi-Fi 802.11 b/g/n, HSDPA 3.2 Mbit/s and HSUPA 2 Mbit/s.

This phone is available with European, Asian and North American 3G bandings. The North American 3G bandings version of the phone is a limited availability and is not available in the US.

Software features

User interface

The phone is one of the few smartphones to feature the Samsung Bada operating system platform. The UI is Samsung's own TouchWiz 3.0, which, like its 2 predecessors (TouchWiz 2.0 and TouchWiz), utilizes widgets. The 3 most notable widgets pre-installed in TouchWiz 3.0 are Daily Briefing (including all essential information such as weather, finance, AP mobile news, and schedule), Feeds and Updates, and Buddies now (allowing users to call, send texts to, and read Facebook or Twitter feeds off their favorite contacts). Users are allowed to have up to 10 home screens to add widgets.
  
Applications

In terms of Internet Browser, Samsung Wave is pre-installed with Dolphin Browser v2.0 (based on WebKit). While this browser supports Flash, it is disabled by default to improve page load time.

By default, the phone comes with Picsel Viewer, which is capable of reading .pdf documents and Microsoft Office file formats. Users from selected countries can buy and download Picsel Office Editor from Samsung Apps.

As for Samsung apps, users can also download applications, games and widgets from the application store.

Other software includes the GPS software that comes with this phone (LBS Route 66), Palringo IM, Facebook, Twitter, social hub, mini diary, daily briefing, memo, video player, FM radio, media browser, voice recorder, e-mail and pre-installed Asphalt 5.

Media support

MP3, AAC, AAC+, e-AAC+, WMA, AMR, WAV, MP4, FLAC, MPEG4, H.263, H.264, WMV, AVI, DivX, XviD, MKV

Android porting

Due to many owners of the phone disliking the Bada software many people have worked on porting the popular Android OS to the Wave 2. The ported versions known are Froyo, Gingerbread, Ice Cream Sandwich, Jelly Bean and KitKat. However, they are still being developed and some features, such as GPS, may be limited or not function as intended.

See also 

 Exynos  Samsung
 Amoled  Samsung

References

External links

Samsung site:
Official Samsung Wave website
Samsung Mobile Wave website
Reviews:
Phonearena.com review by PhoneArena Team, June 4th 2010
GSMArena.com review by GSMArena team, 19 November 2010

Support Forums

Samsung Wave Support Forum created by Wave owners
Bada Forums by Badaforums.net

Bada (operating system)
S-8530
Mobile phones introduced in 2010
Discontinued smartphones